Fantawild is a chain of amusement parks located in various cities of China. The first park opened in the mid-to-late 2000s in Chongqing. , 16 amusement parks operate under the Fantawild name, with seven currently under construction. The chain is owned by the Huaqiang Group. The mascot of the parks is a blue dinosaur named DuLuDuBi, and is typically used as the public image for the chain.

Locations

See also
 Happy Valley, another chain of amusement parks in China

References

External links
  (Chinese)

Amusement park companies